The 1928–29 British Home Championship was a football tournament played between the British Home Nations during the 1928–29 season. The competition was won by Scotland, who won all three matches with strong attacking football epitomised by Hughie Gallacher, who scored seven of his team's 12 goals in hat tricks over Wales and Ireland.

Both England and Scotland began strongly, England defeating the Irish at home, whilst the Scots did likewise against the Welsh in a commanding performance. England then became tournament front–runners by beating Wales away 3–2. Wales and Ireland drew 2–2 in the last game for the Welsh, a result which put both sides out of contention for tournament champion. Scotland's next match was in Ireland and the ensuing ten goal thriller made them favourites for the trophy as they put seven goals past the Irish, conceding three in return. In the final game, both England and Scotland performed strongly, but buoyed by their recent rout of the Irish in Belfast, Scotland secured the tournament with a late goal from Alec Cheyne.

Table

Results

References

 British Home Championship 1919-20 to 1938-1939  - dates, results, tables and top scorers at RSSSF

1928–29 in English football
1928–29 in Scottish football
Brit
1929 in British sport
1928-29
1928–29 in Northern Ireland association football